Nongsa jikseol (literally Straight Talk on Farming) is a Korean agricultural book written by two civil ministers (munsin), Jeong Cho and Byeon Hyo-mun as ordered by Sejong the Great (r. 1418 - 1450) during the early period of Korean Joseon Dynasty (1392 – 1897). 

It consists of only one volume and was published in 1429, the 11th year of the King's reign as gwanchan (官撰, books published by the government), and widely distributed to regional officers of each province in the following year. From onwards, it was published as different editions called naesabon (內賜本) in 1492, siphangbon (十行本) in 1656, sungjeongbon (崇禎本) in 1686. Among them, a naesabon edition was transmitted to Japan and the book is referred to many agricultural books including Sallim gyeongje ("Farm Management") and Imwon gyeongjeji ("Sixteen Discourses on Rural Economy"). While the contents of Nongsa jikseol are mostly limited to main grains harvested in Korea and the descriptions are short and simple, it is the first book compiled for Korean agricultural environment. The book was used as a guide to local Gwonnonggwan (勸農官) officers in charge of agricultural affairs.

See also
Jibong yuseol
Siuijeonseo

References

Korean books
Agriculture books